D76 is a state road in Croatia that connects Makarska Riviera to Imotski and Bosnia and Herzegovina. Furthermore, the road has junctions to major roads, namely A1 motorway in Zagvozd interchange, connecting to Split and Zagreb, and D62 state road, also in Zagvozd, which in turn connects to Šestanovac to the west and to Vrgorac to the east.

The road, as well as all other state roads in Croatia, is managed and maintained by Hrvatske ceste, a state-owned company.

Road junctions and populated areas

See also
 Highways in Croatia
 Hrvatske autoceste

Maps

Sources

D076
D076